Cameron Gray (born 13 August 2003) is a New Zealand swimmer specialising in sprint events. He first represented his country at the 2022 World Aquatics Championships, and won a bronze medal in the 50 m butterfly at the 2022 Commonwealth Games.

Biography
Born in Auckland on 13 August 2003, Gray was educated at Westlake Boys High School. He is a member of the North Shore Swimming Club and is coached by Andy McMillan. He made his senior international debut in 2022 at the 2022 World Aquatics Championships, finishing 35th in the 50 m butterfly and 39th in the 200 m freestyle.

Gray represented his country at the 2022 Commonwealth Games. In the 50 m butterfly, he recorded a time of 24.02 seconds in the heats to qualify 14th fastest for the semifinals. He then was seventh fastest in the semifinals, with a time of 23.58 seconds, and swam a time of 23.27 seconds in the final to win the bronze medal.

References

External links
 
 
 

2003 births
Living people
New Zealand male butterfly swimmers
Commonwealth Games competitors for New Zealand
Commonwealth Games bronze medallists for New Zealand
Commonwealth Games medallists in swimming
Swimmers at the 2022 Commonwealth Games
Swimmers from Auckland
People educated at Westlake Boys High School
21st-century New Zealand people
Medallists at the 2022 Commonwealth Games